born  (December 28, 1941 – August 10, 2020) was a Japanese film, stage, and television actor.

Life
He graduated from Aoyama Gakuin University. Watari belonged to the karate club at university. He made his screen debut in 1964, in Isamu Kosugi's Abare Kishidō, and received one of the Elan d'or Awards. At Nikkatsu, Watari appeared in such films as Tokyo Drifter and the Outlaw series.

Watari was mentored at Nikkatsu by Yujiro Ishihara. When Nikkatsu shifted to focusing on Roman Porno films in the early seventies, Watari was one of many actors who left the studio.

Watari was due to play the main role in Kinji Fukasaku’s film Battles Without Honor and Humanity, but because of illness he was not able to appear. In 1974, he was forced to step down from the lead role of Katsu Kaishū in the Taiga drama Katsu Kaishū on NHK, again because of illness, after appearing in only nine episodes. In 1976, Watari won best actor of Blue Ribbon Award for his role in Kinji Fukasaku`s film Yakuza Graveyard.

In Japan, Watari is probably still best known for his role as Keisuke Daiomon in the detective series "Seibu Keisatsu" on TV Asahi. He also appeared in the popular detective drama "Taiyō ni Hoero!" as a replacement for Yujiro Ishihara in 1986.

Watari became the president of Ishihara Promotion after Yujiro's death in 1987 but in 2011 he resigned due to his declining health.

On June 10, 2015 he was hospitalised after suffering a heart attack and underwent surgery. Seven days later it was announced that he was in rehabilitation and would be discharged from hospital in about a month.

He had a younger brother, Tsunehiko Watase, who was also an actor. As a singer, Watari is known for his hit song "Kuchinashi no Hana"  and he appeared in the Kōhaku Uta Gassen in 1974 and 1993.

He died of pneumonia on August 10, 2020, at the age of 78.

Selected filmography

Films

Television

Video games

Honours
Medal with Purple Ribbon (2005)
Order of the Rising Sun, 4th Class, Gold Rays with Rosette (2013)

References

External links
Tetsuya Watari Official web site 

1941 births
2020 deaths
Japanese male film actors
Japanese male stage actors
Japanese male television actors
Japanese male video game actors
Japanese male voice actors
Actors from Shimane Prefecture
Deaths from pneumonia in Japan
Male voice actors from Shimane Prefecture
Taiga drama lead actors
Recipients of the Medal with Purple Ribbon
Recipients of the Order of the Rising Sun, 4th class